Maggie Steber is an American documentary photographer. Her work has documented a wide range of issues, including the African slave trade, Native American issues in the United States, natural disasters, and science.

Steber has produced the book Dancing on Fire: Photographs from Haiti. She is a member of VII Photo Agency and has been awarded a first prize World Press Photo award and a Guggenheim Fellowship.

Life and work
Steber was born in Texas. She studied journalism and art at the University of Texas at Austin. Early in her career, she lived and worked in Galveston, Texas, working as a reporter and photographer for The Galveston Daily News and as a picture editor for Associated Press in New York City. Steber was a director of photography for the Miami Herald and is a contributor to magazines including Life, The New York Times Magazine, The New Yorker, Smithsonian, People, Newsweek, Time, Sports Illustrated, The Sunday Times Magazine, and Merian Magazine of Germany.

Steber has worked in Haiti for over 25 years documenting the history and culture of the Haitian people. Her essays on Haiti have appeared in The New York Times and she has a monograph titled Dancing on Fire: Photographs from Haiti.

National Geographic has published her essays on Miami, the African slave trade, the Cherokee Nation, sleep, soldiers’ letters, Dubai and a story on the science of memory. Steber was one of eleven photographers included in National Geographic'''s 2013 exhibition, Women of Vision: National Geographic Photographers on Assignment.Steber is a member of VII Photo Agency. She is also a member of Facing Change Documenting America, a group of civic-minded photographers covering important American issues. She currently lives in Miami, Florida.

Publications
Publications by SteberDancing on Fire: Photographs from Haiti. New York City: Aperture, 1991. .

Publications with contributions by SteberFacing Change: Documenting America.'' Prestel, 2015. .

Awards
1987: 1st prize, Spot News single image category, World Press Photo award, Amsterdam
 Leica Medal of Honor
 The Ernst Haas Photographers Grant
 Overseas Press Club Oliver Rebbot Award for Best Photographic Coverage from Abroad
 1998: Alicia Patterson Foundation Fellowship for "Photographing and Reporting on Haiti after Duvalier"
 2007: John S. and James L. Knight Foundation grant
 2017: Guggenheim Fellowship from the John Simon Guggenheim Memorial Foundation

References

External links

1949 births
Living people
American photographers
American women journalists
20th-century births
National Geographic photographers
VII Photo Agency photographers
20th-century American women photographers
20th-century American photographers
21st-century American women
Women photojournalists